Janette Hales Beckham, commonly known as Janette C. Hales and later, Janette Hales Beckham ( Callister; June 7, 1933 – March 4, 2022), was the tenth general president of the Young Women organization of the Church of Jesus Christ of Latter-day Saints (LDS Church) from 1992 to 1997. She was also a member of the Utah State Legislature from 1988 to 1991.

Biography 

Janette Callister was born in Springville, Utah, and raised in Spanish Fork, Utah. She is the daughter of Thomas Leonard Callister (1899–1966) and Hannah Carrick (1904–93). She attended Brigham Young University (BYU) on scholarship and graduated in 1969. While at BYU, she met her future husband, Robert H. Hales. They were married in 1955 in the Salt Lake Temple. The couple lived in San Antonio, Texas, New York City, and San Francisco and raised five children.

Robert Hales was an ophthalmologist. He was a professor of medicine at the University of Utah and a professor of nursing at BYU. Robert Hales died of cancer in March 1988.

Shortly after her husband's death, Hales was appointed by Utah Governor Norman H. Bangerter to fill a vacancy in the Utah House of Representatives. In the November 1988 election, Hales was elected to the House as a Republican. Hales served in the 48th Utah State Legislature. She decided not to run for re-election in 1990 and stepped down after one term in January 1991.

In March 1990, when Elaine L. Jack was released as a counselor in the general presidency of the LDS Church's Young Women organization to become general president of the church's Relief Society, Young Women president Ardeth G. Kapp selected Hales as her new counselor. Hales served in this capacity until 1992, when Kapp was released and Hales was selected as her successor.

During her tenure as general president of the Young Women, Hales was assisted by four counselors: Virginia H. Pearce, Patricia P. Pinegar, Bonnie D. Parkin, and Carol B. Thomas. Pinegar went on to serve as general president of the church's Primary and Parkin went on to serve as the general president of the Relief Society. Hales was released in 1997 and succeeded by Margaret D. Nadauld.

In 1995, while serving as general Young Women president, Hales married Raymond E. Beckham and changed her surname to Beckham. He was a BYU professor of communication who was heavily involved in fundraising and supervising extension work, including the operations of BYU's short-lived Las Vegas center.

Beckham was a member of the LDS Church's Olympic Coordinating Committee for the Salt Lake City Winter Olympics from 1998 to 2002. In 2004, Beckham became a member of the Utah Valley State College (later Utah Valley University (UVU)) Board of Trustees and later served as the chair of the board. She left the UVU board in 2011.

Beckham has also served on the board of directors of Deseret Book Company.

Notes

References 
 Janet Peterson and LaRene Gaunt (1993). Keepers of the Flame: Presidents of the Young Women (Salt Lake City: Deseret Book)
"New Young Women General Presidency Called," Ensign, May 1992, pp. 106–07
"Robert H. Hales, Ophthalmologist and Community Leader, Dies at 57", Deseret News, March 27, 1992
"Provo Couple put Service First", Deseret News, July 26, 2007
"Janette C. Hales Beckham", mormonwiki.com
"Sustaining the Living Prophets", LDS General Conference, talk given by Janette Hales Beckham, April 1996

1933 births
2022 deaths
American leaders of the Church of Jesus Christ of Latter-day Saints
Brigham Young University alumni
Counselors in the General Presidency of the Young Women (organization)
General Presidents of the Young Women (organization)
Republican Party members of the Utah House of Representatives
Politicians from Provo, Utah
People from Spanish Fork, Utah
People from Springville, Utah
Utah Valley University people
Women state legislators in Utah
Latter Day Saints from Utah